Palaiochora is a small town in Chania regional unit, Greece. It is located 70 km south of Chania, on the southwest coast of Crete and occupies a small peninsula 400 m wide and 700 m long. The town is set along 11 km of coastline bordering the Libyan Sea. It is the seat of the municipality of Kantanos–Selino and its population was 1,675 in the 2011 census.

Economy

Palaiochora's economy is based on tourism and agriculture (mainly the cultivation of tomatoes in greenhouses, and also olive oil production). It has been a relaxing holiday destination since the early 1970s when it was popular with hippies.

Palaiochora has crystal clear waters, well organised beaches, and beautiful isolated small anchorages. It is served by numerous hotels, restaurants, tavernas, cafés, and bars. Facilities in Palaiochora include bank branches, a post office, a central telephone office, a health centre, doctor's offices, dentists, chemists, a police station, a coast guard and customs office, and many types of stores. Ferry boats connect Palaiochora with Sougia, Agia Roumeli, Loutro, Chora Sfakion, and Gavdos.

Local attractions include the abundant wild flowers in the spring, the opportunity to see Venetian and Byzantine frescoes in some of the local churches (those in Anidri and Voutas are particularly impressive), and a museum dedicated to the Acretans in the town itself. The nearby village of Azogires, 5 km away,  has a museum dedicated to the area as well as the now uninhabited Monastery of the 99 Holy Fathers and what is said to be the largest evergreen plane tree on the island. In 2009, a plan was announced to open a number of signposted walking routes in the area. The town is on the European E4 walking trail.

Palaiochora stands on the ruins of the ancient city of Kalamydi.

History
In 1278, the Venetian general Marino Gradenigo built a fort in the Palechora area, called the "Selino  Kasteli". The fort gave its name to the whole province, previously known as 'Orina', which was then renamed 'Selino'. The fort was destroyed in 1332 and rebuilt in 1334. Near the fort, the Venetians established a new settlement for workers and merchants called Vourgos. The general Hayreddin Barbarossa destroyed the fort in 1539, but it was refurbished in 1595 by Dolf. In 1645, the Turks conquered the town and modified the fort to suit their needs.

In 1834 an English traveler named Robert Pashley found the fort completely destroyed and the whole area uninhabited. Only a granary and one or two small buildings remained. In 1866 the resettlement of  Paleochora began.

In December 1866, during the Cretan uprising against the Ottoman Turks, the British gunboat  evacuated some 340 women and children from Paleochora, then known as Selino Castelli (or Selino Kastelli), and took them to Piraeus for safety. This caused a major international incident since the Ottoman authorities accused the British of siding with the Cretan rebels. Russian gunboats followed suit, evacuating refugees from Loutro and Sougia, east of Paleochora.

During the Battle of Crete during World War II, the town was the scene of fighting between motorcycle-riding troops of the German 95th Reconnaissance Battalion and the Eighth Greek Regiment (Provisional) with elements of the Cretan Gendarmerie. The Germans built a number of gun emplacements by the Venetian Fortezza, and their remains are still visible.

The general trend of urbanization that began in other parts of Greece in the 1960s had already started in the previous decade on the nearby island of Gavdos. During that period the islanders exchanged their land on Gavdos for former Turkish holdings on Crete, which had now become exchangeable through a state program. They created a community known as 'Gavdiotika', in the 'old town' section of Paleochora.

Climate

The town has a Mediterranean climate.

References

External links
Current weather conditions
paleochora.com
The Paleochora Site - Walks, Weather, Recipes, Botany, History of Paleochora
Private page featuring many anecdotes and photos involving Paleochora
Site dedicated to palaiochora with many webcams , virtual tour and other villages around palaiochora

Populated places in Chania (regional unit)